The Vinča symbols, sometimes known as the Danube script, Vinča signs, Vinča script, Vinča–Turdaș script, Old European script, etc., are a set of untranslated symbols found on Neolithic era (6th to 5th millennium BC) artifacts from the Vinča culture and related "Old European" cultures of Central Europe and Southeastern Europe. Whether this is one of the earliest writing systems or simply symbols of some sort is disputed. They have sometimes been described as an example of "pre-writing" or "proto-writing". The symbols went out of use around 3500 BC.

Discovery

In 1875, archaeological excavations directed by the Hungarian archaeologist Baroness Zsófia Torma (1840–1899) at Tordos (present Turdaș, Romania) unearthed marble and fragments of pottery inscribed with previously unknown symbols. At the site, on the Mureş river, a feeder into a  tributary  of  the  Danube, female figurines, pots, and artifacts made  of  stone were also found. In 1908, a similar cache was found during excavations directed by Serbian archaeologist Miloje Vasić (1869–1956) in Vinča, a suburb of Belgrade (Serbia), some 245 km from Turdaș. Later, more such fragments were found in Banjica, another part of Belgrade. Since 1875, over 150 Vinča sites have been identified in Serbia alone, but many, including Vinča itself, have not been fully excavated. Thus, the culture of the whole area is called the Vinča culture, and the symbols are often called the Vinča–Turdaș script.

The discovery of the Tărtăria tablets in Romania by a team directed by Nicolae Vlassa in 1961 revived the debate. Vlassa believed the inscriptions to be pictograms. Other items found at the site of the discovery were subsequently radiocarbon-dated to before 4,000 BC, 1,300 years earlier than the date Vlassa expected and pre-dating the writing systems of the Sumerians and Minoans. However, the circumstances of their discovery and authenticity of the tablets themselves is disputed.

Corpus 

Although a large number of symbols are known, most artifacts contain so few symbols that they are very unlikely to represent a complete text. Possibly the only exception is the Sitovo inscription in Bulgaria, the dating of which is disputed; regardless, even that inscription has only around 50 symbols.

Most of the inscriptions are on pottery, with the remainder appearing on ceramic spindle whorls, figurines, and a small collection of other objects. The symbols themselves consist of a variety of abstract and representative pictograms, including zoomorphic (animal-like) representations, combs or brush patterns and abstract symbols such as swastikas, crosses and chevrons. Over 85% of the inscriptions consist of a single symbol. Other objects include groups of symbols, of which some are arranged in no particularly obvious pattern, with the result that neither the order nor the direction of the signs in these groups is readily determinable. The usage of symbols varies significantly between objects; symbols that appear by themselves tend almost exclusively to appear on pots, while symbols that are grouped with other symbols tend to appear on whorls. Quantitative linguistic analysis leads to the conclusion that 59% of the signs share the properties of pottery marks, 11.5% are part of asymmetric ornaments typical for whorls of the Vinca culture, and 29.5% may represent some sort of symbolic (semasiographic) notation.

A database of Vinca inscriptions, DatDas, has been developed by Marco Merlini:

Dating 
These findings are important because the bulk of the Vinča symbols were created between 4500 and 4000 BC, with the symbols on the Tărtăria clay tablets possibly dating back to around 5300 BC (controversially dated by association). This means that the Vinča finds predate the proto-Sumerian pictographic script from Uruk (modern Iraq), which is usually considered to be the oldest known writing system, by more than a thousand years. Analyses of the symbols showed that they have little similarity with Near Eastern writing, resulting in the opinion that these symbols and the Sumerian script probably arose independently.

Meaning and interpretations 
The nature and purpose of the symbols is a mystery. Although attempts have been made to interpret the symbols, there is no agreement as to what they might mean.

Property marks 
Some symbols, principally those restricted to the base of pots, are wholly unique and such signs may denote the contents, provenance/destination or manufacturer/owner of the pot. However, some of the symbols have been repeatedly found throughout the territory of the Vinča culture, hundreds of years apart and in locations kilometers away from each other.

Numerical signs 

Some of the "comb" or "brush" symbols, which collectively constitute as much as a sixth of all the symbols so far discovered, may represent a form of prehistoric counting. The Vinča culture appears to have traded its wares quite widely with other cultures, as demonstrated by the widespread distribution of inscribed pots, so it is possible that the "numerical" symbols conveyed information about the value of the pots or their contents. Other cultures, such as the Minoans and Sumerians, used their scripts primarily as accounting tools; the Vinča symbols may have served a similar purpose.

Religious symbolism 
Some have suggested that the symbols may have been used for religious purposes in a traditional agricultural society. If so, the fact that the same symbols were used for centuries with little change suggests that the ritual meaning and culture represented by the symbols likewise remained constant for a very long time, with no need for further development. The use of the symbols seems to have been abandoned (along with the objects on which they appear) at the start of the Bronze Age, suggesting that the new technology brought with it significant changes in social organization or population, and beliefs.

One argument in favour of the ritual explanation is that the objects on which the symbols appear do not seem to have had much long-term significance to their owners – they are commonly found in pits and other refuse areas. Certain objects, principally figurines, are most usually found buried under houses. This is consistent with the supposition that they were prepared for household religious ceremonies in which the signs incised on the objects represent expressions: a desire, request, vow, etc. After the ceremony was completed, the object would either have no further significance (hence would be disposed of) or would be buried ritually (which some have interpreted as votive offerings).

Early writing or proto-writing 
Some researchers have suggested that the markings represent an early form of writing, often as part of a broader tradition of literacy referred to as the "Danube script" by the archaeo-semiologist Marco Merlini and the "Old European script" by the anthropologist Marija Gimbutas. Gimbutas reconstructed a hypothetical pre-Indo-European "Civilization of Old Europe", which she defines as having occupied the area between the Dniester valley and the Sicily-Crete line. She incorporated the Vinča markings into her model of Old Europe, suggesting that they might either be the writing system for an Old European language, or, more probably, a kind of symbolic "pre-writing" system. However, this has been generally met with skepticism. Vinča symbols themselves have not been found on an area wider than southeastern Hungary, western Romania, and western Bulgaria, as described by Winn.

See also

Notes

References

Citations

Bibliography

Further reading

External links 

 2008 Symposium The Danube Script: Neo-Eneolithic Writing in Southeastern Europe. Held in Romania
 Vinca-Tordos symbols at omniglot.com, including a font created by Romanian linguist Sorin Paliga
 The Old European Script: Further evidence – Shan M. M. Winn

Pre-Indo-Europeans
Prehistory of Southeastern Europe
Neolithic Europe
Neolithic Serbia
Undeciphered writing systems
Proto-writing
Archaeological artifacts
Vinča culture